Pareuptychia ocirrhoe, the two-banded satyr or banded white ringlet, is a species of butterfly of the family Nymphalidae. It is found from Mexico to the Guyanas, Paraguay and northern Argentina. The habitat consists of forests.

The wingspan is about 37 mm.

The larvae feed on Eleusine species.

Subspecies
Pareuptychia ocirrhoe ocirrhoe (Panama, Surinam)
Pareuptychia ocirrhoe interjecta (d'Almeida, 1952) (Brazil: Rio de Janeiro, Bahia and Mato Grosso do Sul)

References

Butterflies described in 1776
Euptychiina
Fauna of Brazil
Nymphalidae of South America
Taxa named by Johan Christian Fabricius